Miami County (county code MI) is a county located in east-central Kansas and is part of the Kansas City metropolitan area. As of the 2020 census, the county population was 34,191. Its county seat and most populous city is Paola.

History

Native Americans
The first settlements of the area were by Native American Indian tribes, primarily in the 1820s through the 1840s. This was due to their removal from areas east (Ohio, Illinois and Indiana)and the designation of the area as part of the Indian Territory. The tribes included were the Miami and Shawnee, and the Pottawatomie, Piankeshaw, Kaskaskia, Wea and Peoria, which comprised the Confederated Tribes. Early white settlers during that time were primarily serving as missionaries to the tribes. Over time, other settlers continued to arrive to build homes on the Miami reservation, and by 1854, the U.S. Government purchased all but  from the Miami tribe.

Two notable members of the Confederated Tribes were Christmas Dagnette, and Baptiste Peoria.  Dagnette was born in 1800, and was a nephew of a Wea chief, originally from Indiana.  He had received some formal education, spoke several of the Native American languages, and additionally spoke English, French and Spanish.  He had served as an interpreter to the U.S. Government by the age of sixteen.  Having moved to the area that is now Miami County with the Wea tribe, he served as chief for several years before his death in 1848.  Baptiste Peoria was also born around 1800, and while he didn't receive formal education like Dagnette, he learned the languages of the Shawnee, Delaware, Pottawatomie, and several more of the Confederated Tribes. In addition, he spoke English and French. Peoria was of both French and Native American Indian ethnicity, and like Dagnette, served as an interpreter and as a chief for some time.  Baptiste Peoria became a respected member of the Paola Town Company, and was instrumental in the founding and development of the city of Paola in the early and mid-1860s. He moved (to what is now Oklahoma) with his tribe in 1868, when they were once again removed to a newly designated Indian territory, and died there in 1878. Some of the Native American Indians stayed in the area (Miami County), and became citizens of the United States.

Trail of Death
A notorious path known as the Trail of Death has been officially recognized by the states of Indiana, Illinois, Missouri and Kansas. Signs in all four states highlight the regional historic pathway. The 27-mile trail through the county follows local roads starting in the north at the intersection of 215th Street and Metcalf Avenue(old U.S. Highway 69). It moves south along Metcalf Avenue to Kansas Highway 68, where it again turns west along K-68 to Old Kansas City Road north of Paola. There it turns south on Old KC Road to Baptiste Drive in Paola. The trail makes a short turn back east on Baptiste Drive to North Pearl Street, where it turns south again to West Wea Street adjacent to Paola's historic Square. It turns west on Wea Street to South Silver Street, follows what is also known as Old Kansas City Road to 327th Street. By turning west on 327th, the trail enters its final path on one road that undergoes several names. The county road 327th Street becomes 6th St Osawatomie as it turns south and enters the city limits. As it exits the city limits, it becomes Plum Creek Road/ K-7 Highway. The farthest south monument for the Trail of Death is located at 363rd Street and Plum Creek Road.

A treaty signed in 1836 forced Indian tribes in the Eastern United States to move west of the Mississippi River, but Pottawatomie Chief Menominee, his tribe, and others refused to leave their land. In autumn 1838, the Pottawatomie were removed by force from their villages and underwent a treacherous two-month journey. On the trip, 42 of the 859 Native Americans died, most of them children and the elderly, from typhoid fever and the stress of the passage. They were buried along the route, which became known as the Trail of Death.

When they reached Kansas, some Pottawatomie lived for about a decade in Linn County at Sugar Creek Trading Post, which is now St. Philippine Duchesne Memorial Park. Other Pottawatomie tribes were relocated to various eastern parts of the state.

The trail, which marks the route the Pottawatomie took, begins in Rochester, Ind., and meanders through Illinois and Missouri to end in eastern Kansas. The route was documented by Jesse C. Douglas, who accompanied the group on the march.

The Trail of Death Commemorative Caravan of Pottawatomie Indians and historians has retraced the 660-mile trail every five years since 1988. Travelers on the trail today can view artifacts from the Pottawatomie Tribe along with other historical displays at the Miami County Historical Museum located in Paola, 12 E. Peoria St. Those displays include a diary of their trip, which hangs just outside the Early American History Room. .

Pre-Civil War Period
When Kansas Territory was incorporated in 1854 due to the Kansas–Nebraska Act, the Missouri Compromise of 1820 was essentially repealed. Bordering the slave state of Missouri to its east, the county (Miami) and surrounding areas became a location for violence between abolitionists and the "border ruffians" of Missouri. These acts of violence and battles that took place primarily from 1854 to 1858, became known as border wars, and Kansas became known as Bleeding Kansas. Kansas Territory was not yet a state, and it was a battle on which forces would become dominant, slave or free. Many abolitionists came from other states to live in the area and ensure Kansas' entry as a state as a free, or anti-slavery one. The county's most notable abolitionist was John Brown, who moved to Osawatomie, making it the headquarters for him and his anti-slavery forces. As a result of this, Osawatomie, as well as the surrounding countryside and communities became the center for several battles and acts of violence during this period. Near Osawatomie are historic sites of John Brown, such as his famous Civil War lookout.

Etymology
The county was originally established in 1855 as Lykins County, after Dr. David Lykins.  Lykins was a Baptist missionary to the Native American Indian tribes in the area, and had built a school for them in what is now rural Miami County.  He also served as a member of the territorial council, and was pro-slavery. By January 1861, the anti-slavery forces had been established as dominant, and Kansas entered the union as a free state. As a result of Dr. Lykins' views on slavery, Lykins County's name was changed to Miami County on June 3, 1861.  The new name was in honor of the predominant Native American tribe that settled the area, the Miami.

Natural gas
By 1886 a pipeline was completed to the town's square, where it illuminated lamps there. By 1887, Paola had its street lamps lighted with lamps using natural gas. Other fields of natural gas were discovered throughout Miami County by 1887, and for a time, the area around Paola was considered to be a gas belt. In the summer of 1887, a Natural Gas Jubilee was held, which was a celebration for people to come and marvel at the use of natural gas.

Geography

Lakes
 Hillsdale Lake – The largest lake in Miami County, this lake is also diverse in what it offers. Among the activities at Hillsdale are camping, fishing, swimming, boating, hunting, and hiking. Model airplane flying also has its own special designated area.
 Louisburg Middle Creek Lake – It is located 7 miles south of Louisburg, Kansas on Metcalf road. It is a prime source of water for the city of Louisburg. In addition the lake offers superb fishing and camping. Fishing boats are allowed on the lake but swimming and water sports are prohibited. The lake is managed by the Kansas Department of Wildlife and Parks. Species stocked in the lake include Bluegill, Channel, Flathead, Large and Smallmouth Bass, Crappie, Saugeye, Walleye, White Bass and Sunfish. The Lake and camp sites are open to the public at no charge. Great place to get away.

Other lakes in Miami County, each with specific restrictions and activities to offer, include:
 Miola Lake
 Miami County State Lake
 Osawatomie Lake
 Paola Lake
 Hunters Lake
 Wagstaff Lake

Adjacent counties
 Johnson County (north)
 Cass County, Missouri (east)
 Bates County, Missouri (southeast)
 Linn County (south)
 Anderson County (southwest)
 Franklin County (west)
 Douglas County (northwest)

Demographics

Miami County is included in the Kansas City, MO-KS Metropolitan Statistical Area.

As of the 2000 census, there were 28,351 people, 10,365 households, and 7,794 families residing in the county.  The population density was 49 people per square mile (19/km2).  There were 10,984 housing units at an average density of 19 per square mile (7/km2).  The racial makeup of the county was 95.96% White, 1.54% Black or African American, 0.52% Native American, 0.17% Asian, 0.01% Pacific Islander, 0.44% from other races, and 1.36% from two or more races. Hispanic or Latino of any race were 1.59% of the population.

There were 10,365 households, out of which 37.00% had children under the age of 18 living with them, 63.50% were married couples living together, 8.00% had a female householder with no husband present, and 24.80% were non-families. 21.00% of all households were made up of individuals, and 8.80% had someone living alone who was 65 years of age or older.  The average household size was 2.66 and the average family size was 3.09.

In the county, the population was spread out, with 27.90% under the age of 18, 7.30% from 18 to 24, 29.70% from 25 to 44, 23.10% from 45 to 64, and 11.90% who were 65 years of age or older.  The median age was 37 years. For every 100 females there were 97.80 males.  For every 100 females age 18 and over, there were 96.00 males.

The median income for a household in the county was $46,665, and the median income for a family was $55,830. Males had a median income of $37,441 versus $27,271 for females. The per capita income for the county was $21,408.  About 3.60% of families and 5.50% of the population were below the poverty line, including 5.40% of those under age 18 and 8.40% of those age 65 or over.

Landmarks
Miami County communities are host to many landmarks and buildings with historical significance. From historical bridges and architecture such as the Creamery Bridge, as well as John Brown & Civil War history in and near Osawatomie, to the hall of fame musical landmark and cider mill near Louisburg, to a library constructed in honor of a wine maker in Paola. The Poor Farm Cemetery, historically significant because many of those interred at the site once worked the county's Poor Farm, is just one of several historical cemeteries.

Community
The location of Miami County, a short drive south of Kansas City, allows it to offer residents and visitors aspects of both city and rural lifestyles. Miami County and its cities, Paola, Louisburg, Spring Hill, Osawatomie, and Fontana offer a variety of activities and hobbies. Among them are golf, hiking, camping, fishing, hunting, horseback riding, water sports, astronomy and a variety of community festivals and events that take place throughout the year.  There are also historical places and museums to study its history. During the summer, each community offers a farmer's market with booths offering locally grown food and goods.

Miami County Farm Tour
In the spring of each year, various Miami County farms and farm businesses participate in the Miami County Farm Tour. The public is invited to come to each farm with their families as part of a free self-guided driving tour.  The goal is to experience and learn about the operations, produce and/or animals at each farm stop.  Visitors and residents of Miami County have made the farm tour an annual event.

Agriculture
More than  within the county are used to grow soybeans. The top livestock items in number are Cattle and calves, totaling over 43,000. Horses and layers (chickens) are next with over 3,400 and 2,100 respectively. (

The 1990 World Supreme Champion dairy cow once resided in Miami County. This holstein cow, named Enns Banner Olivia, came to Miami County from Marion County, Kansas when she was three years old to the farm named Keene, Pretz Holsteins.

Miami County has the Fontana Co-Op for farmers to take harvested crop for storage until ready for market. There are two locations for them to make use of.

Government

Presidential elections

Laws
Miami County was a prohibition, or "dry", county until the Kansas Constitution was amended in 1986 and voters approved the sale of alcoholic liquor by the individual drink with a 30 percent food sales requirement.

The county voted "No" on the 2022 Kansas Value Them Both Amendment, an anti-abortion ballot measure, by 52% to 48% despite backing Donald Trump with 68% of the vote to Joe Biden's 29% in the 2020 presidential election.

Education
At one time in its history, Miami County had more than 100 schools. While most of those school buildings either no longer exist, or have been vacant for many years, the Rock Creek School at 231st & Pressonville, a one-room schoolhouse built in 1910, was used as a school until 1966. The residents near it in the northwest corner of Miami County, purchased the red brick schoolhouse from the school district for $1. Today, the schoolhouse is still used as a township hall to hold meetings, suppers, and other community events.
In 1878, a Normal School, one of five in the state of Kansas, was established in Paola by Professor John Wherrell, which flourished for six years. Notable students of the Normal School were: U.S. Senator Chester I. Long, and the father of peanuts George Washington Carver.

Unified school districts
 Osawatomie USD 367
 Paola USD 368
 Louisburg USD 416
 Spring Hill USD 230
 Wellsville USD 289

Communities

Cities
Fontana
Louisburg
Osawatomie
Paola (county seat)
Spring Hill (partly in Johnson County)

Unincorporated communities

 Antioch
 Bucyrus (CDP)
 Drexel Corner
 Hillsdale (CDP)
 Jingo
 Lento
 New Lancaster
 Ringer
 Somerset
 Stanton
 Wagstaff
 Wea

Townships
Miami County is divided into thirteen townships.  The cities of Louisburg, Osawatomie, Paola, and Spring Hill are considered governmentally independent and are excluded from the census figures for the townships.  In the following table, the population center is the largest city (or cities) included in that township's population total, if it is of a significant size.

See also
 National Register of Historic Places listings in Miami County, Kansas

References

Notes

Further reading

 Standard Atlas of Miami County, Kansas; Geo. A. Ogle & Co; 47 pages; 1901.
 An Illustrated Historical Atlas of Miami County, Kansas; Edwards Brothers; 48 pages; 1878.

External links

County
 
 Miami County - Directory of Public Officials
Maps
 Miami County Maps: Current, Historic, KDOT
 Kansas Highway Maps: Current, Historic, KDOT
 Kansas Railroad Maps: Current, 1996, 1915, KDOT and Kansas Historical Society

 
Kansas counties
Kansas placenames of Native American origin
1855 establishments in Kansas Territory